Taxidermy is the debut album of English alternative rock band Queenadreena, released in 2000. The enhanced-CD release includes a short film by Martina Hoogland-Ivanow involving time-lapse photography and dream-like visuals.

Release
Taxidermy was released in the United Kingdom on compact disc which features a short film by Martina Hoogland-Ivanow, and as a 12" vinyl LP.

Critical reception
NME wrote of the album: "while carrying on Daisy Chainsaw's predilection for rock as infantile nightmare, here the scope is much wider than a one-track take on banshee pop. There are some obvious precedents, notably Björk and PJ Harvey, but much more than either of those two reference points, this debut album is frequently akin to eavesdropping on psychotherapy."

Track listing

Singles
"X-ing Off the Days" (1999)
"Cold Fish" (1999)
"Jolene" (2000)
"I Adore You" (2000)

Personnel
Queenadreena
KatieJane Garsidevocals, arrangement 
Crispin Grayguitar, glockenspiel, harmonica, backing vocals, arrangement 
Dizzy Qbass
Steve Drewdrums

Technical personnel
Ken Thomasproduction
Queenadreenaproduction

References

External links

Cover art and liner notes at the Internet Archive

2000 albums
2000 debut albums
Queenadreena albums
Albums produced by Ken Thomas (record producer)
Warner Records albums